Gem is an unincorporated community in Hemphill County, Texas.

History
A post office called Gem was established in 1909, and remained in operation until 1954. A first settler named the community after his wife.

Gallery

References

Unincorporated communities in Hemphill County, Texas
Unincorporated communities in Texas